Dimeh-ye Shakraleh (also Romanized as Dīmeh-ye Shaḵrāleh; also known as Dīmeh-ye Shargelar) is a village in Howmeh-ye Gharbi Rural District, in the Central District of Ramhormoz County, Khuzestan Province, Iran. At the 2006 census, its population was 73, in 16 families.

References 

Populated places in Ramhormoz County